Putzmeister is a German manufacturer of concrete pumps and other equipment for pumping, distributing and placing concrete, mortar and other high-density solids, and for preparing, temporarily storing, processing and transporting these materials.  The firm is headquartered at Aichtal, and is the largest in its field. It also provides pumps for a wide range of different materials, for example slurries, fly ash, sewage, compost and water.

Putzmeister is German for "Plaster Master" (Putz Meister). In 2017, the company had 3,000 employees worldwide.

History
Putzmeister was founded by Karl Schlecht in 1958. Schlecht designed a mortar machine based on his diploma thesis at the University of Stuttgart.

In 1986, Putzmeister 52Z's were used in the Chernobyl nuclear accident, pumping over 300,000 m³ (400,000 cubic yards) of concrete to entomb reactor number 4, setting a world record at the time for volume pumping.

During the 2011 Japanese nuclear accidents at the Fukushima plant, multiple Putzmeister concrete boom pumps were flown to Japan from locations around the world. After the initial success of a M58-5 unit, additional M62-6s and 70Z's were transported to Japan on-board chartered Antonov An-124s, the world's second largest cargo plane. The pumps will be deployed to try to stabilise the four reactors with additional water pumping capacity.

In May 2008, Putzmeister reached a world record in vertical concrete pumping, via their specially designed concrete pumps type BSA 14000 SHP-D, in building the Burj Khalifa. In 2008, Putzmeister broke its own record by pumping concrete to a height of more than 700 m at Burj Khalifa.

As the largest German-Sino transaction ever, at the end of January 2012 Putzmeister was sold to the Chinese Sany Heavy Industries, the construction-equipment maker run by China’s richest man Liang Wengen.

Products 
 Concrete Placing Systems
Concrete pump
Truck-Mounted Concrete Placing Boom Pump
 Boom Pump Product Range: 20Z-Meter, 28Z-Meter, 31Z-Meter, 32Z-Meter, 36Z-Meter, 38Z-Meter, 38Z-5-Meter, 39Z-Meter, 40Z-Meter, 42Z-Meter, 47Z-Meter, 51Z-5-Meter, 56Z-Meter, 63Z-Meter.
 "C" Valve (BRF model designation)
 "S" Valve (BSF model designation)
BSA Trailer Pumps: BSA 100 Series, BSA 14000 Series, BSA 21000 Series.
 Truck-Mounted Line Pumps: City Pump CP 2110 HP, City Pump CP 2112H, City Pump CP 2116H, VS 50 PTO, VS 70 PTO, VSP 70.
 Thom-Katt Trailer Pumps: TK 7, TK 20, TK 40, TK 50, TK 60, TK 70.
 Mortar Machines
Shotcrete Machines
Tunneling and Mining Equipment
 Industrial pumps

Gallery

References

External links
 Beka Putzmeister Chile

Companies based in Baden-Württemberg
Construction equipment manufacturers of Germany
Manufacturing companies established in 1958
Manufacturing companies of Germany
2012 mergers and acquisitions
Sany
1958 establishments in West Germany